An auto-da-fé (or auto da fé or auto de fe) is a Roman Catholic church ritual which became associated with the Spanish Inquisition. 

Auto-da-fé may also refer to:

Auto Da Fe, rock climbing route at Mount Arapiles in Victoria, Australia

Literature
Auto-da-Fé (novel), English-language title of Elias Canetti's 1935 novel Die Blendung
Auto-da-Fé (play), 1941 play by Tennessee Williams
"Auto-da-Fé" (short story), by Roger Zelazny, published 1967 in Dangerous Visions

Music
Auto Da Fé (band), Irish new wave musical group formed in the Netherlands
Auto Da Fé, an album by SPK
"Auto-da-Fé", a song from the operetta Candide

See also
Auto de Fay, a 2002 autobiography by Fay Weldon